Peter Laurence Duff (12 November 1912 – 6 November 2002) was a Scotland international rugby union player. He also represented the British and Irish Lions.

Rugby Union career

Amateur career

He played for Glasgow Academicals, and Uddingston.

Provincial career

He represented Glasgow District.

He played for the Scotland Possibles side in their trial match against the Scotland Probables on 15 January 1938.

International career

He played 6 matches for Scotland.

He was selected for the 1938 British Lions tour to South Africa playing in two of the Test matches against South Africa, scoring a try in both.

References

Sources

 Bath, Richard (ed.) The Scotland Rugby Miscellany (Vision Sports Publishing Ltd, 2007 )
 Massie, Allan A Portrait of Scottish Rugby (Polygon, Edinburgh)

1912 births
2002 deaths
British & Irish Lions rugby union players from Scotland
Glasgow Academicals rugby union players
Glasgow District (rugby union) players
Rugby union players from South Lanarkshire
Scotland international rugby union players
Scotland Possibles players
Scottish rugby union players
Uddingston RFC players
Rugby union number eights